Hightail is a retired thoroughbred racehorse. He is a son of 2003 Horse of the Year Mineshaft. His dam, Stormy Renee, is a daughter of the multiple Grade 1 winner Fleet Renee.

He is best known for winning the Breeders' Cup Juvenile Sprint in 2012. He had one additional start following the race and finished fourth to Goldencents in the Delta Jackpot Stakes in November, 2012. He fractured his sesamoid in early 2013 and was retired to stud thereafter.

Stud Record

Notable progeny

c = colt, f = filly, g = gelding

Pedigree

 indicates inbreeding

References

2010 racehorse births
Racehorses trained in the United States
Racehorses bred in Kentucky
Breeders' Cup Juvenile Sprint winners
Thoroughbred family 9-f